The efficiency ratio indicates the expenses as a percentage of revenue (expenses / revenue), with a few variations – it is essentially how much a corporation or individual spends to make a dollar; entities are supposed to attempt minimizing efficiency ratios (reducing expenses and increasing earnings). The concept typically applies to banks. It relates to operating leverage, which measures the ratio between fixed costs and variable costs.

Efficiency means the extent to which cash is generated over time and relative to other enterprises. Efficiency ratios for a given year may therefore be used to determine whether an enterprise has generated enough cash in relation to other years and in relation to other institutions (Koen and Oberholster, 1999). For measuring efficiency can be used receivable collection period ratio.

Formula 
 Efficiency =  

An example
Citigroup, Inc. (2003):
Revenues, net of interest expense: 77,442
Operating expenses: 39,168

That makes the efficiency ratio =  = 0.51 or 51%.

If "benefits, claims, and credit losses", for 11,941, are added to operating expenses, the efficiency ratio worsens to  = 0.66

See also
Business margin
Financial market efficiency
Operating leverage
Sortino ratio
Business process reengineering
Cost–benefit ratio

References

External links

 
Efficiency Ratio
Financial Ratio Analysis

Example
C: Income Statement for CITIGROUP INC - Yahoo! Finance
Citigroup - Annual Reports & Proxy Statements

Financial ratios